Athrips sisterina is a moth of the family Gelechiidae. It is found in Saudi Arabia.

References

Moths described in 1989
Athrips
Moths of Asia